Ricardo Darnell Gathers (born January 7, 1994) is an American rapper and former American football tight end. He was drafted by the Dallas Cowboys in the sixth round (217th overall) in the 2016 NFL Draft. He played college basketball at Baylor University and did not play college football.

Early years
Gathers attended Riverside Academy. He was named Louisiana Mr. Basketball while at Riverside Academy in Reserve, Louisiana. As a sophomore, he contributed to his team winning the state title, while averaging 19.8 points, 11.5 rebounds, 4.5 blocks and earning Most Outstanding Player honors at the state tournament.

As a junior, he averaged 20.7 points, 16.2 rebounds and 3.9 blocks per game. As a senior, he helped his team reach the Class 2A state championship game, while averaging 22 points, 17 rebounds, 4.1 blocks, 2.1 assists and 1.1 steals per game.

College career
Gathers accepted a basketball scholarship from Baylor University. He became a starter at power forward as a junior, averaging 11.6 points (second on the team), 11.6 rebounds (led the team), 1.2 steals and one block and in 29.9 minutes per game. At the end of the season, he received All-Big 12, honorable-mention All-American and Big 12 All-Defensive Team honors. He led the conference in double-doubles with 17 and recorded a school record 28 rebounds in a win over Huston-Tillotson.

As a senior, he averaged 11.4 points and 9.1 rebounds per game. He finished as Baylor's All-Time leading rebounder. He also was the first player ever to reach over 1,000+ points and 1,000+ rebounds in school history.

Professional career

Although he had not played a down of football since middle school as a 13-year-old, Gathers informed Baylor head coach Art Briles that he would be joining the Bears football team for the 2016 season. However, he later decided to forgo playing for Baylor and entered the 2016 NFL draft after the Baylor men's basketball team lost in the first round of the 2016 NCAA Men's Division I Basketball Tournament to Yale.

Dallas Cowboys
Gathers was selected by the Dallas Cowboys in the sixth round (217th overall) of the 2016 NFL Draft, based on the potential he showed during his pre-draft workout. In rookie minicamp the team considered playing him at defensive end, but decided to keep him at tight end instead. On September 3, he was released and was signed to the practice squad the next day. He signed a reserve/future contract on January 17, 2017.

After a strong training camp and preseason, Gathers made the Cowboys' initial 53-man roster in 2017. However, he suffered a concussion in the preseason, and was placed on the  injured reserve on September 4, which made him eligible to return in week 8 at the earliest. Despite practicing with the squad since week 9, after week 13, he was shut down for the season. It was later revealed that he also suffered jaw and neck injuries as well.

In 2018, the Cowboys made the unconventional move of keeping him as the fourth tight end to avoid losing him to waivers, even though he was arrested on the eve of cuts for marijuana possession. He was the fourth-string tight end behind Geoff Swaim, Blake Jarwin and rookie Dalton Schultz. In Week 5, he recorded his first professional catch against the Houston Texans. He finished with 3 receptions for 45 yards.

On June 14, 2019, it was announced that Gathers was suspended for the first game of the season, after violating the NFL's policy and program on substances of abuse. On August 5, Gathers was waived by the Cowboys.

Cleveland Browns
On August 11, 2019, he was signed as a free agent by the Cleveland Browns. He was placed on the reserve/suspended list on August 31, 2019. He was waived by the Browns on September 10, after being reinstated from the suspension.

Personal life
Gathers' father is the cousin of the late Hank Gathers, an All-American and former Loyola Marymount star. Gathers is married and has a child. During his time away from football, he self-taught himself to create, arrange and produce hip-hop music under the pseudonym Rickadon.

On August 31, 2018, he was arrested for possession of marijuana in Frisco, Texas.

References

1994 births
Living people
American football tight ends
Basketball players from Louisiana
Baylor Bears men's basketball players
Cleveland Browns players
Dallas Cowboys players
People from LaPlace, Louisiana
Players of American football from New Orleans
Power forwards (basketball)
American men's basketball players